Farelli is an Italian surname. Notable people with the surname include:

Cary Farelli (born 1957), Italian ice hockey player
Giacomo Farelli (1629–1706), Italian painter
Simone Farelli (born 1983), Italian footballer

See also
Fanelli

Italian-language surnames